"Pray You Catch Me" is a song recorded by American singer Beyoncé for her sixth studio album, Lemonade (2016). The song's music video is part of a one-hour film with the same title as its parent album, originally aired on HBO.

Production and composition

The song was recorded at Conway Studios in Los Angeles, California in September 2015. Knowles wrote the song with Kevin Garrett and James Blake and produced it with the former. "Pray You Catch Me" is a downtempo song. Knowles's vocal range spawns from the low note F3 to the high note G4. The song begins with Knowles singing, "You can taste the dishonesty / It’s all over your breath as you pass it off so cavalier." NME'''s Larry Bartleet described the song as a "piano and strings-backed ballad. Everest True from The Independent described it as a "stately, intense and secret – there is just the occasional throb of bass and softened beat to accentuate her message. With other lyrics, this could be a love song."

Commercial performance

After the release of Lemonade, "Pray You Catch Me" debuted on Billboard Hot 100 chart at number 37 and peaked on the Hot R&B/Hip-Hop songs chart at number 22.

Live performance
Beyoncé performed the song at the 2016 VMAs as part of a medley of songs from her Lemonade album.

Usage in media

On May 12, 2016, the song was included in the episode "At Last" of Grey's Anatomy''.

Charts

Certifications

References

2010s ballads
2016 songs
2016 singles
Songs written by Kevin Garrett (musician)
Beyoncé songs
Songs written by Beyoncé
Song recordings produced by Beyoncé
Contemporary R&B ballads